In architecture, the scarsella is a small apse with a rectangular or square plan which protrudes outside the main structure. The term scarsella, in ancient Florentine, means "purse", in particular the leather purse for money.

Overview
A scarsella can be seen in the Baptistery of Florence which, initially built octagonal, was then equipped with a smaller rectangular construction attached to the original building. Another medieval scarsella is that of the Cappellone degli Spagnoli in Santa Maria Novella, also in Florence, which served as a model for Filippo Brunelleschi to design the plans of the Sagrestia Vecchia of San Lorenzo and of the Pazzi Chapel. Brunelleschi studied a model of the chapel in which the base was square and the scarsella opened in the center of one of the walls, with the side dimension equal to one third of the chapel and with an area equal, therefore, to a one ninth of the entire chapel area. This scheme proved to be successful and was actively used by the great architects of the Renaissance, especially for centrally-planned buildings. An early example of a monumental scale is the Basilica of Santa Maria delle Carceri in Prato designed by Giuliano da Sangallo in which the presbyteral area composes a sort of a large bag. Another example of a scarsella is the apse of the church of Santa Maria dei Miracoli in Venice.

Gallery

See also
Antechamber
Apse
Apse chapel

References

Arches and vaults
Church architecture
Architectural elements
Italian words and phrases